Nils Erik Hellsten (19 February 1886 – 12 April 1962) was a Swedish fencer who competed at the 1920, 1924 and 1928 Olympics. He won a bronze medal in the individual épée in 1924 and finished fifth in 1928. In 1920 he also took part in the individual foil contest. At the world championships he took two bronze medals in the team épée, in 1931 and 1934.

Hellsten was a military officer, a major in reserves. He was a teacher and deputy head at the Swedish School of Sport and Health Sciences. He is not related to the Olympic gymnast Nils Hellsten.

References

External links
 

1886 births
1962 deaths
Swedish male épée fencers
Olympic fencers of Sweden
Fencers at the 1920 Summer Olympics
Fencers at the 1924 Summer Olympics
Fencers at the 1928 Summer Olympics
Olympic bronze medalists for Sweden
Olympic medalists in fencing
Sportspeople from Stockholm
Medalists at the 1924 Summer Olympics
20th-century Swedish people